This is a list of articles in contemporary philosophy.

 1926 in philosophy
 1962 in philosophy
 20th-century philosophy
 A New Philosophy of Society: Assemblage Theory and Social Complexity
 A New Refutation of Time
 A. C. Grayling
 A. P. Martinich
 Abandonment (existentialism)
 Abraham Edel
 Abstract expressionism
 Abstract labour and concrete labour
 Accumulation by dispossession
 Against His-Story, Against Leviathan
 Alain Badiou
 Alain de Benoist
 Alain Etchegoyen
 Alan Ross Anderson
 Alan Soble
 Alan Stout (philosopher)
 Albert Camus
 Albert Chernenko
 Alberto Jori
 Alberto Toscano
 Albrecht Wellmer
 Aldo Gargani
 Alejandro Deustua
 Alejandro Rozitchner
 Alexander Bard
 Alexandre Koyré
 Alexandru Dragomir
 Alexis Kagame
 Alf Ross
 Alfred Adler
 Alfred I. Tauber
 Alfred Jules Ayer
 Alfred Jules Émile Fouillée
 Alfred North Whitehead
 Allan Bloom
 Alvin Plantinga
 Anarchism
 Anarchism and anarcho-capitalism
 Anarchism and Friedrich Nietzsche
 Anarchism in Israel
 Anarchism in Russia
 Anarchism in Spain
 Anarchism in Sweden
 Anarchism in the United States
 Anarchism in Turkey
 Anarchism: A Documentary History of Libertarian Ideas
 Anarchist Studies
 Anarcho-capitalism and minarchism
 Anatoly Lunacharsky
 Anders Nygren
 André Malet (philosopher)
 Andreas Speiser
 Anna-Teresa Tymieniecka
 Anomalous monism
 Anthony Gottlieb
 Anti-consumerism
 Anti-Dühring
 Anti-Semite and Jew
 Anti-statism
 Antonio Caso Andrade
 Antonio Gramsci
 Antonio Negri
 Arborescent
 Arda Denkel
 Aretaic turn
 Armin Mohler
 Arthur Danto
 Artificial consciousness
 Arvi Grotenfelt
 Asa Kasher
 Asiatic mode of production
 Association for Logic, Language and Information
 Attitude polarization
 Aurel Kolnai
 Australasian Journal of Philosophy
 Avrum Stroll
 Barrows Dunham
 Bas van Fraassen
 Base and superstructure
 Being and Nothingness
 Being in itself
 Benedetto Croce
 Berlin Circle
 Bernard Bosanquet (philosopher)
 Bernard Williams
 Bert Mosselmans
 Bertrand de Jouvenel
 Between Past and Future
 Black swan theory
 Bob Hale (philosopher)
 Boris Furlan
 Boris Grushin
 Bracha L. Ettinger
 Bracketing (phenomenology)
 Bronius Kuzmickas
 Bryan Magee
 Bureaucracy
 C. D. Broad
 C. S. Lewis
 C. Stephen Evans
 Capital accumulation
 Capital, Volume I
 Capitalist mode of production
 Carl Gustav Hempel
 Carlos Castrodeza
 Carveth Read
 Categories (Peirce)
 Charles Morris, Baron Morris of Grasmere
 Charles Parsons (philosopher)
 Charles Taylor (philosopher)
 Chicago school (mathematical analysis)
 Chinese room
 Christine Buci-Glucksmann
 Christoph Schrempf
 Clarence Irving Lewis
 Claude Lefort
 Claude Lévi-Strauss
 Claudio Canaparo
 Clive Bell
 Cognitive map
 Colin Howson
 Colin McGinn
 Commodification
 Commodity (Marxism)
 Confirmation holism
 Connexive logic
 Consensual living
 Constant capital
 Constantin Noica
 Consumption of fixed capital
 Contemporary philosophy
 Contemporary Political Theory
 Contemporary Pragmatism
 Contingency, irony, and solidarity
 Contrast theory of meaning
 Contributions to Philosophy (From Enowning)
 Cora Diamond
 Cornel West
 Cornelius Castoriadis
 Critical pedagogy
 Criticism of capitalism
 Criticism of postmodernism
 Criticisms of electoralism
 Critique of Cynical Reason
 Critique of Dialectical Reason
 Critiques of Slavoj Žižek
 Curt John Ducasse
 Czesław Znamierowski
 Daniel Dennett
 Daniel Rynhold
 Dariush Shayegan
 Das Argument (journal)
 Dasein
 David Benatar
 David Braine (philosopher)
 David Chalmers
 David Cockburn
 David Kellogg Lewis
 David Oswald Thomas
 David Pearce (philosopher)
 David Prall
 David S. Oderberg
 David Schmidtz
 David Wong (philosopher)
 Dean Zimmerman (philosopher)
 Degenerated workers' state
 Deleuze and Guattari
 Delfim Santos
 Democracy in Marxism
 Democratic Rationalization
 Denis Dutton
 Dermot Moran
 Dewitt H. Parker
 Dialectica
 Dieter Henrich
 Differential and Absolute Ground Rent
 Dimitrije Mitrinović
 Dimitris Dimitrakos
 Diogenes (journal)
 Doctrine of internal relations
 Dominant ideology
 Dominik Gross
 Donald Burt
 Donald Davidson (philosopher)
 Dorothy Emmet
 Doxastic logic
 Dual power
 Dudley Knowles
 Eckart Schütrumpf
 Edith Wyschogrod
 Edmund Gettier
 Edward Bullough
 Elaine Scarry
 Eleutherius Winance
 Elliott Sober
 Émile Durkheim
 Émile Meyerson
 Emotivism
 Epistemological anarchism
 Eric Higgs (philosopher)
 Erich Fromm
 Erkenntnis
 Ernest Gellner
 Ernesto Garzón Valdés
 Ernst Cassirer
 Ernst Ehrlich
 Ernst Gombrich
 Ernst Nolte
 Erwin Panofsky
 Erwin Schrödinger
 Esperanza Guisán
 Ethical problems using children in clinical trials
 Ethics Bowl
 Étienne Balibar
 Étienne Borne
 Étienne Souriau
 Eugen Rosenstock-Huessy
 Exchange value
 Exploitation
 Exploitation theory
 F. C. S. Schiller
 F. H. Bradley
 Fact, Fiction, and Forecast
 False consciousness
 Falsifiability
 Faux frais of production
 Feng Youlan
 Ferdinand Ebner
 Fi Zilal al-Qur'an
 Finance capitalism
 Form of life (philosophy)
 Francis Fukuyama
 Frank R. Wallace
 Frantz Fanon
 Franz Rosenzweig
 Fred Miller (philosopher)
 Frederick C. Beiser
 Frederick Copleston
 Frederick Ferré
 Frederick Suppe
 Fredric Jameson
 Freudo-Marxism
 Friedrich Waismann
 From Bakunin to Lacan
 Future Primitive and Other Essays
 G. E. M. Anscombe
 Gabriel Nuchelmans
 Gani Bobi
 Gary Drescher
 General intellect
 Geneviève Fraisse
 Geoffrey Hellman
 Geoffrey Hunter (logician)
 Georg Klaus
 George Caffentzis
 George Dickie (philosopher)
 George Edward Moore
 George H. Smith
 George Santayana
 Gettier problem
 Gila Sher
 Gilbert Harman
 Giles Fraser
 Gilles Deleuze
 Giorgio Agamben
 Giovanni Gentile
 Giuseppe Peano
 Gödel's ontological proof
 Gopal Balakrishnan
 Gordon Park Baker
 Gottlob Frege
 Graham Priest
 Gray Dorsey
 Gricean maxims
 Günter Abel
 Gustav Bergmann
 Guy Debord
 György Lukács
 György Márkus
 Hajime Tanabe
 Han Yong-un
 Hans Hahn
 Hans Lipps
 Hans Reichenbach
 Hans Sluga
 Hans-Georg Gadamer
 Hao Wang (academic)
 Harald K. Schjelderup
 Hassan Kobeissi
 Hegemony
 Helen Longino
 Hélène Cixous
 Helene von Druskowitz
 Henri Berr
 Henri Lefebvre
 Henry Corbin
 Herbert Feigl
 Herbert Marcuse
 Heterophenomenology
 Hilary Putnam
 Historicity (philosophy)
 History and Future of Justice
 History of the Church–Turing thesis
 Honorio Delgado
 Hossein Ziai
 Howard Adelman
 Howison Lectures in Philosophy
 Hubert Damisch
 Hubert Dreyfus
 Hugh Mellor
 Humana.Mente – Journal of Philosophical Studies
 Huston Smith
 Hypothetico-deductive model
 I Heart Huckabees
 I. A. Richards
 Ideal observer theory
 Idealistic Studies
 Ideology
 Igor Pribac
 Illtyd Trethowan
 Imperialism
 In Defense of Anarchism
 Indeterminacy of translation
 Indexicality
 Individualist anarchism
 Information processing
 Institutional cruelty
 Instrumental rationality
 Integral (spirituality)
 Integral ecology
 International Association for Philosophy of Law and Social Philosophy
 International Journal of Žižek Studies
 International Philosophical Quarterly
 Interpellation (philosophy)
 Introduction to Mathematical Philosophy
 Irving Copi
 Irving Singer
 Is God Dead?
 Isaiah Berlin
 Ivan Aguéli
 Ivan Sviták
 Jaap Kruithof
 Jack Copeland
 Jack Russell Weinstein
 Jacques Derrida
 Jacques Lacan
 Jacques Maritain
 Jacques Rancière
 James DiGiovanna
 James E. Faulconer
 James Franklin (philosopher)
 James G. Lennox
 James Griffin (philosopher)
 James Gustafson
 James M. Edie
 Jamie Whyte
 Janet Coleman
 Jason Walter Brown
 Jawaharlal Nehru
 Jean Baudrillard
 Jean Clam
 Jean Grenier
 Jean-François Lyotard
 Jean-Luc Nancy
 Jean-Marc Ferry
 Jean-Paul Sartre
 Jeff Malpas
 Jens Staubrand
 Jerry Fodor
 Jerzy Perzanowski
 Jesse Prinz
 Jesús Mosterín
 Joel J. Kupperman
 Johannes Agnoli
 John Corcoran (logician)
 John Finnis
 John Foster (philosopher)
 John Greco (philosopher)
 John Hospers
 John Kekes
 John L. Pollock
 John McDowell
 John N. Gray
 John P. Burgess
 John Rawls
 John Searle
 John von Neumann
 John Weckert
 John Wisdom
 Jon Barwise
 Jordi Pigem
 José Ortega y Gasset
 Josefina Ayerza
 Joseph Beuys
 Joseph de Torre
 Joseph Henry Woodger
 Joseph Hilbe
 Joseph J. Spengler
 Joseph Margolis
 Joseph Runzo
 Josiah Royce
 Journal of Aesthetics and Art Criticism
 Journal of Applied Non-Classical Logics
 Journal of Logic, Language and Information
 Journal of Philosophical Logic
 Juan Manuel Guillén
 Judith Butler
 Juha Varto
 Julia Kristeva
 Jürgen Habermas
 Jürgen Mittelstraß
 Kancha Ilaiah
 Kang Youwei
 Karen J. Warren
 Karl Ameriks
 Karl Jaspers
 Karl Loewenstein
 Karl Menger
 Karl Popper
 Katarzyna Jaszczolt
 Keiji Nishitani
 Kit Fine
 Konstantin Chkheidze
 Konstanty Michalski
 Krastyo Krastev
 Krishna Chandra Bhattacharya
 Kurt Almqvist
 Kurt Baier
 Kurt Gödel
 Kurt Grelling
 Kyle Stanford
 L'existentialisme est un humanisme
 Labor aristocracy
 Lacan at the Scene
 Larry Sanger
 Latitudinarianism (philosophy)
 Laughter (Bergson)
 Laurence BonJour
 Law of accumulation
 Law of value
 Lawrence Jarach
 Leo Mikhailovich Lopatin
 Leo Strauss
 Leonardo Moledo
 Leonidas Donskis
 Les jeux sont faits
 Lev Chernyi
 Lewis Call
 Lewis White Beck
 Lila: An Inquiry into Morals
 Linguistics and Philosophy
 List of contributors to Marxist theory
 Listen, Anarchist!
 Ljubomir Cuculovski
 Logic of information
 Logica Universalis
 Logical holism
 Logical positivism
 Logicomix
 Logocentrism
 Lorenzo Peña
 Louis Althusser
 Louis Pojman
 Ludwig Wittgenstein
 Luitzen Egbertus Jan Brouwer
 Luxemburgism
 Lwow-Warsaw School of Logic
 Lynn Pasquerella
 Mao Zedong
 Marek Siemek
 Mario Bunge
 Mark Addis
 Mark de Bretton Platts
 Mark Philp
 Mark Sacks
 Mark Vernon
 Mark Wrathall
 Marshall McLuhan
 Martha Nussbaum
 Martin Buber
 Martin Heidegger
 Martin Hollis (philosopher)
 Marvin Minsky
 Marx W. Wartofsky
 Masakazu Nakai
 Maurice Blanchot
 Maurice De Wulf
 Maurice Merleau-Ponty
 Mauricio Suarez
 Maxence Caron
 Meera Nanda
 Mental representation
 Mereological nihilism
 Michael Oakeshott
 Michael Tye (philosopher)
 Michel Foucault
 Michel Foucault bibliography
 Michel Onfray
 Michel Serres
 Milan Damnjanović (philosopher)
 Minimum programme
 Mirror stage
 Mohandas Karamchand Gandhi
 Monroe Beardsley
 Moritz Geiger
 Moritz Schlick
 Morris Weitz
 Muhammad Husayn Tabatabaei
 Murray Rothbard
 Myth of Progress
 Narhar Ambadas Kurundkar
 Nassim Nicholas Taleb
 Nathan Salmon
 National-Anarchism
 Nationalism and Culture
 Ned Block
 Nelson Goodman
 Neocolonial Dependence
 Neurophilosophy
 New Foundations
 New Libertarian Manifesto
 New Sincerity
 New Times (politics)
 Nicholas Rescher
 Nick Bostrom
 Nicola Abbagnano
 Nietzsche and Philosophy
 Nina Karin Monsen
 Noël Carroll
 Non-politics
 Non-voting
 Norbert Bolz
 Norbert Leser
 Norman Malcolm
 Norman Swartz
 Norwood Russell Hanson
 Notes on "Camp"
 Now and After
 Objet petit a
 Oets Kolk Bouwsma
 Okishio's theorem
 Olaf Helmer
 Olavo de Carvalho
 Olga Hahn-Neurath
 On Certainty
 On Contradiction (Mao Zedong)
 On Formally Undecidable Propositions of Principia Mathematica and Related Systems
 OntoClean
 Organic composition of capital
 Oriental despotism
 Original proof of Gödel's completeness theorem
 Orlando J. Smith
 Orthodox Trotskyism
 Osvaldo Lira
 Otto Bauer
 Otto Neurath
 Outline of anarchism
 Overproduction
 Oxford Literary Review
 P. F. Strawson
 Panait Cerna
 Parametric determinism
 Patricia Churchland
 Paul Churchland
 Paul de Man
 Paul Grice
 Paul Guyer
 Paul Häberlin
 Paul R. Patton
 Paul Ricœur
 Paul Virilio
 Paulo Freire
 Penelope Maddy
 Per Bauhn
 Per Martin-Löf
 Periyar E. V. Ramasamy
 Permanent war economy
 Peter Caws
 Peter Geach
 Peter Hacker
 Peter Millican
 Peter Simons
 Peter Singer
 Peter Steinberger
 Peter Stillman (academic)
 Philip Hallie
 Philipp Frank
 Philippe Lacoue-Labarthe
 Philippe Nys
 Phillip Cary
 Philosophical interpretation of classical physics
 Philosophical Investigations
 Philosophical Investigations (journal)
 Philosophy and Phenomenological Research
 Philosophy and Real Politics
 Philosophy and Social Hope
 Philosophy and the Mirror of Nature
 Philosophy in a New Key
 Philosophy of artificial intelligence
 Philosophy of dialogue
 Philosophy of engineering
 Philosophy of information
 Philosophy of technology
 Philotheus Boehner
 Pieranna Garavaso
 Pierre Bourdieu
 Pierre Boutang
 Piotr Chmielowski
 Pirmin Stekeler-Weithofer
 Pirsig's metaphysics of Quality
 Plato and a Platypus Walk Into a Bar
 Polish Logic
 Popper's experiment
 Post-anarchism
 Post-colonial anarchism
 Post-industrial society
 Post-left anarchy
 Post-Scarcity Anarchism
 Post-structuralism
 Postanalytic philosophy
 Postmodern Christianity
 Postmodern social construction of nature
 Postmodernism
 Postmodernism, or, the Cultural Logic of Late Capitalism
 Pragmatic maxim
 Praxis School
 Prefigurative politics
 Preintuitionism
 Prices of production
 Principia Ethica
 Principia Mathematica
 Productive forces
 Proletarian internationalism
 Proletarianization
 Psychical distance
 Psychoanalysis and Religion
 R. G. Collingwood
 Rabindranath Tagore
 Rachida Triki
 Radical interpretation
 Radical translation
 Rado Riha
 Ralph Johnson (philosopher)
 Ralph Tyler Flewelling
 Ramón Xirau
 Ramsey sentence
 Ranjana Khanna
 Raphaël Enthoven
 Rate of profit
 Raymond Aron
 Raymond Smullyan
 Re.press
 Reading Capital
 Received view of theories
 Recuperation (sociology)
 Reflective disclosure
 Reformism
 Religion & Ethics Newsweekly
 Religious interpretations of the Big Bang theory
 Ren Jiyu
 Rentier capitalism
 Repressive hypothesis
 Reproduction (economics)
 Richard A. Macksey
 Richard Rorty
 Richard Schacht
 Richard Tarnas
 Richard von Mises
 Richard Wollheim
 Robert Audi
 Robert Brandom
 Robert Nozick
 Robert Rowland Smith
 Robert Stalnaker
 Roberto Refinetti
 Rodolfo Mondolfo
 Roger Caillois
 Roger Scruton
 Roland Barthes
 Rolf Sattler
 Romanas Plečkaitis
 Ronald Dworkin
 Rosa Luxemburg
 Rose Rand
 Rüdiger Safranski
 Rudolf Carnap
 Rudolf Schottlaender
 Ruling class
 Rupert Read
 Ruth Barcan Marcus
 Ryle's regress
 Saint Genet
 Sakae Osugi
 Samuel Maximilian Rieser
 Sanjaya Belatthaputta
 Sarvepalli Radhakrishnan
 Sathya Sai Baba
 Saul Kripke
 Sayyid al-Qimni
 Scientific essentialism
 Search for a Method
 Semantic view of theories
 Semeiotic
 Sergio Panunzio
 Simon Blackburn
 Simple commodity production
 Six Myths about the Good Life
 Sketch for a Theory of the Emotions
 Slavoj Žižek
 Social conflict theory
 Social ecology
 Socially necessary labour time
 South Park and Philosophy: You Know, I Learned Something Today
 Spomenka Hribar
 Sri Aurobindo
 Stanisław Leśniewski
 State monopoly capitalism
 Stefan Pawlicki
 Stephen David Ross
 Stephen Laurence
 Stephen Mulhall
 Stephen Pepper
 Stephen Toulmin
 Steven Tainer
 Stewart Shapiro
 Subject of labor
 Sun Yat-sen
 Superprofit
 Surplus product
 Surplus value
 Susan Haack
 Susan Oyama
 Susan Sontag
 Susan Stebbing
 Syed Ali Abbas Jallapuri
 Tadeusz Kotarbiński
 Taha Abdurrahman
 Takiyyetin Mengüşoğlu
 Tasos Zembylas
 Technological determinism
 Technological Somnambulism
 Temporal single-system interpretation
 Tendency of the rate of profit to fall
 The Absence of the Book
 The Birth of the Clinic
 The Bounds of Sense
 The Case for God
 The Imaginary (Sartre)
 The Logic of Scientific Discovery
 The Myth of Sisyphus
 The Philosophical Forum
 The Royal Way
 The Seminars of Jacques Lacan
 The Sublime Object of Ideology
 The Transcendence of the Ego
 Theodor Lipps
 Thierry de Duve
 Third camp
 Thomas Munro
 Thomas Nagel
 Thomas Samuel Kuhn
 Thoralf Skolem
 Three Worlds Theory
 Tim Dean
 Tom Polger
 Tomonubu Imamichi
 Tore Nordenstam
 Toronto School of communication theory
 Tractatus Logico-Philosophicus
 Transformation problem
 Transitional demand
 Two Dogmas of Empiricism
 Type physicalism
 Ugo Spirito
 Ultra-imperialism
 Underconsumption
 Unequal exchange
 Universal class
 Uri Gordon
 Ursula Wolf
 Use value
 Valentin Ferdinandovich Asmus
 Valorisation
 Value added
 Value product
 Vanja Sutlić
 Varadaraja V. Raman
 Verification theory
 Verificationism
 Vianney Décarie
 Victor Kraft
 Vienna Circle
 Vincent F. Hendricks
 Vittorio Hösle
 Vojin Rakic
 W. D. Ross
 Wage labour
 Walter Berns
 Walter Terence Stace
 Warren Shibles
 Wendell Berry
 Werner Hamacher
 Werner Heisenberg
 Werner Krieglstein
 What Is Literature?
 What Is Your Dangerous Idea?
 Whitny Braun
 Why I Am Not a Christian
 Wilfrid Sellars
 Willard Van Orman Quine
 Willem B. Drees
 William Craig (philosopher)
 William Fontaine
 William Irwin Thompson
 William James Lectures
 William Kneale
 William L. Rowe
 William McNeill (philosopher)
 William W. Tait
 Władysław Mieczysław Kozłowski
 Władysław Weryho
 Wolfgang Smith
 Wolfgang Stegmüller
 Word and Object
 Workerism
 World communism
 Xu Liangying
 Yves Brunsvick
 Zen and the Art of Motorcycle Maintenance
 Zeno Vendler
 Zofia Zdybicka
 Zollikon Seminars

 
Contemporary